Paul Bunel (Jan 21,1882 - Oct 20,1918) was a Norman photographer.

Born in La Ferté-Fresnel, France Bunel settled in  Vimoutiers from where he traversed the Pays d'Auge in Lower-Normandy, France, to photograph villages, people and Norman costumes of the beginning of the 20th century. From his photographs, he made postcards that become a testimony of the past.

References

Postcard artists
French photographers
1882 births
1918 deaths
French military personnel killed in World War I